Aron C. Wall is an American theoretical physicist, specializing in quantum gravity. He is Lecturer of Physics at the University of Cambridge, and is one of the winners of the 2019 New Horizons in Physics Prize.

Biography and education
He was born on June 7, 1984, the son of programmer Larry Wall. He received a B.A. in liberal arts in 2005 from St. John's College (Annapolis/Santa Fe) and a Ph.D. in physics in 2011 from the Maryland Center for Fundamental Physics of the University of Maryland, College Park, under advisor Ted Jacobson.

From 2011 to  2014 he was a Simons postdoctoral fellow at the University of California, Santa Barbara, from 2014 to 2017 a fellow at the Institute for Advanced Study in Princeton, from 2017 to 2019 a fellow at the Stanford Institute for Theoretical Physics and since then a lecturer in physics at the Cambridge University Department of Applied Mathematics and Theoretical Physics.

Research
It is based on the interpretation of wormholes as pairs of  quantum entangled particles (EPR) by Leonard Susskind and Juan Martín Maldacena, known as the ER-EPR conjecture; however, Wall and colleagues did not use the usual Einstein-Rosen Bridges, but that their wormhole model provides a mathematically equivalent description to quantum teleportation.

Most cited peer-reviewed publications
Wall AC. Maximin surfaces, and the strong subadditivity of the covariant holographic entanglement entropy. Classical and Quantum Gravity. 2014 Nov 4;31(22):225007. Cited 403 times according to Google Scholar
Engelhardt N, Wall AC. Quantum extremal surfaces: holographic entanglement entropy beyond the classical regime. Journal of High Energy Physics. 2015 Jan;2015(1):1-27.  Cited 355 times 
Dong X, Harlow D, Wall AC. Reconstruction of bulk operators within the entanglement wedge in gauge-gravity duality. Physical review letters. 2016 Jul 8;117(2):021601. Cited 319 times 
Gao P, Jafferis DL, Wall AC. Traversable wormholes via a double trace deformation. Journal of High Energy Physics. 2017 Dec;2017(12):1-25. Cited 318 times 
Bousso R, Fisher Z, Leichenauer S, Wall AC. Quantum focusing conjecture. Physical Review D. 2016 Mar 16;93(6):064044. Cited 192 times 
Wall AC. Proof of the generalized second law for rapidly changing fields and arbitrary horizon slices. Physical Review D. 2012 May 29;85(10):104049. Cited 178 timed

Personal life
According to his website, he is active in the New Life Church of the Nazarene.

References

External links
 Personal homepage

1984 births
Living people
Quantum gravity physicists
American relativity theorists
Cambridge mathematicians
St. John's College (Annapolis/Santa Fe) alumni
University of Maryland, College Park alumni
University of California, Santa Barbara people
Institute for Advanced Study people
Place of birth missing (living people)
American members of the Church of the Nazarene